Håll huvet kallt ("Keep Calm") was the Sveriges Television's Christmas calendar in 1994. It is based on the book Eddie och Johanna by Viveca Lärn.

Plot 
Seven-year old Eddie travels by bus from Gothenburg to Lysekil to visit his aunt and uncle. His mother is dead, and his father is an alcoholic.

References

External links 
 

1994 Swedish television series debuts
1994 Swedish television series endings
Sveriges Television's Christmas calendar
Television shows set in Sweden
Bohuslän in fiction
Television shows based on children's books